Nandotsava is a festival celebrated the day after the festival Janmashtami, which celebrates the Lord Krishna's birth.
It is believed that all the villagers of Braj visited Nand Baba's house to see little Krishna and congratulate Mata Yashoda.
Nand Baba distributed ornaments, clothes, cattle and various other valuables among saints and sages. All saints and sages bestowed blessings on Lord Krishna in return.

In Vrindavan this festival is celebrated in various Temples of Lord Krishna.

Panchamrit abhisheka and Maha aarti are performed in honour of Lord Krishna's birth.
On this day people celebrate 'Govinda'- Devotees form small groups and break Maakhan Haandis tied to ropes on high-rise buildings.

External links
 Sri Krishna Janmastmi
 Nandotsav and Janmashtami celebrations of Vrindavan
 Krishna and Bhakti Yog
 Nandotsava

References

 Packert, Cynthia. The Art of Loving Krishna: Ornamentation and Devotion. Indiana University Press, 2010. Print.

Festivals in India
August observances
September observances
Hindu festivals in India